Cosmopterix orichalcea is a moth of the family Cosmopterigidae. It is known from most of Europe (except the Balkan Peninsula) east to Japan.

The wingspan is about 9 mm. The antennae with  apex and two subapical rings white. Forewings black; a large brassy-metallic basal patch, edge very oblique; a broad orange fascia beyond middle, narrowed dorsally, edged with black scales and then with narrow violet-golden-metallic fasciae; a bluish-silvery-metallic sometimes interrupted streak along upper. The larva is pale yellow; dorsal line greenish; head black plate of 2 black, bisected.

Adults are on wing from August to May. Then the larva hibernates outside of the mine in a hibernaculum.

The larvae feed on Anthoxanthum odoratum, Festuca arundinacea, Hierochloe odorata, Milium species, Phalaris arundinacea and Phragmites australis. They mine the leaves of their host plant. They prefer the lower leaves. The mine has the form of an elongate, rather irregular blotch. Most frass is ejected, but the remaining frass is concentrated in a few heaps. A single larva makes several mines. Pupation takes place outside the mine.

References

orichalcea
Moths of Asia
Moths of Europe
Moths described in 1861